Super 5 is a game of chance, in Malta, in which five numbers are randomly drawn from a field of numbers from 1 to 45.  Players have to match at least three of the selected numbers on one ticket to the numbers drawn. The draw for Super 5 is held every Wednesday (if a public holiday falls on a Wednesday, the draws take place on Tuesday), at 19:45, five numbers are randomly drawn in the presence of a Notary Public, members of the public, a representative of the Malta Lotteries and Gaming Authority, and representatives of Maltco Lotteries Limited. The Maltco Lotteries Limited is the company responsible for this game. The draw is transmitted live on TVM (Maltese TV channel]. Results of the game are also featured on the local newspapers of Malta as well on the Maltco website. The information may also be obtained from one of Maltco Lotteries' points of sale.

In order to play the players have to fill a Super 5 coupon indicating the selected numbers and playing options. On the Super 5 coupon, the numbers and different playing options are shown in red boxes. The coupon must be filled by using a blue or black pen only, by marking within the box by an x or a small line (-).

Each simple column of five numbers cost €2.

Gambling in Malta